Ronald Birkett (25 July 1927 – December 1992) was an English professional footballer who played in the Football League as a left winger for New Brighton, Oldham Athletic and Accrington Stanley. He was on the books of Manchester City, without playing for their League side, and also played non-league football for Cromptons Recreation and Mossley, for which he made six appearances in all competitions.

Birkett was born in Warrington, Cheshire, in 1927 and died in Salford, Greater Manchester, in 1992 at the age of 65. Two brothers, Cliff and Wilf, were also professional footballers.

References

1927 births
1992 deaths
Footballers from Warrington
English footballers
Association football wingers
Manchester City F.C. players
Accrington Stanley F.C. (1891) players
Oldham Athletic A.F.C. players
New Brighton A.F.C. players
Mossley A.F.C. players
English Football League players